Low-level waste (LLW) or Low-level radioactive waste (LLRW) is nuclear waste that does not fit into the categorical definitions for intermediate-level waste (ILW), high-level waste (HLW), spent nuclear fuel (SNF), transuranic waste (TRU), or certain byproduct materials known as 11e(2) wastes, such as uranium mill tailings. In essence, it is a definition by exclusion, and LLW is that category of radioactive wastes that do not fit into the other categories. If LLW is mixed with hazardous wastes as classified by RCRA, then it has a special status as mixed low-level waste (MLLW) and must satisfy treatment, storage, and disposal regulations both as LLW and as hazardous waste. While the bulk of LLW is not highly radioactive, the definition of LLW does not include references to its activity, and some LLW may be quite radioactive, as in the case of radioactive sources used in industry and medicine.

LLW includes items that have become contaminated with radioactive material or have become radioactive through exposure to neutron radiation. This waste typically consists of contaminated protective shoe covers and clothing, wiping rags, mops, filters, reactor water treatment residues, equipments and tools, luminous dials, medical tubes, swabs, injection needles, syringes, and laboratory animal carcasses and tissues. The radioactivity can range from just above background levels found in nature to very highly radioactive in certain cases such as parts from inside the reactor vessel in a nuclear power plant.

The definition of low-level waste is set by the nuclear regulators of individual countries, though the International Atomic Energy Agency (IAEA) provides recommendations. Some countries, such as France, specify categories for long-lived low- and intermediate-level waste. U.S. regulations do not define the category of intermediate-level waste.

Disposal

Depending on who "owns" the waste, its handling and disposal is regulated differently. All nuclear facilities, whether they are a utility or a disposal site, have to comply with Nuclear Regulatory Commission (NRC) regulations. The four low-level waste facilities in the U.S. are Barnwell, South Carolina; Richland, Washington; Clive, Utah; and as of June 2013, Andrews County, Texas. The Barnwell and the Clive locations are operated by EnergySolutions, the Richland location is operated by U.S. Ecology, and the Andrews County location is operated by Waste Control Specialists. Barnwell, Richland, and Andrews County accept Classes A through C of low-level waste, whereas Clive only accepts Class A LLW.  The DOE has dozens of LLW sites under management. The largest of these exist at DOE Reservations around the country (e.g. the Hanford Reservation, Savannah River Site, Nevada Test Site, Los Alamos National Laboratory, Oak Ridge National Laboratory, Idaho National Laboratory, to name the most significant).

Classes of wastes are detailed in 10 C.F.R. § 61.55 Waste Classification, enforced by the Nuclear Regulatory Commission, reproduced in the table below.  These are not all the isotopes disposed of at these facilities, just the ones that are of most concern for the long-term monitoring of the sites.  Waste is divided into three classes, A through C, where A is the least radioactive and C is the most radioactive.  Class A LLW is able to be deposited near the surface, whereas Classes B and C LLW have to be buried progressively deeper.

In 10 C.F.R. § 20.2002, the NRC reserves the right to grant a free release of radioactive waste. The overall activity of such a disposal cannot exceed 1 mrem/yr and the NRC regards requests on a case-by-case basis. Low-level waste passing such strict regulations is then disposed of in a landfill with other garbage. Items allowed to be disposed of in this way are: glow-in-the-dark watches (radium) and smoke detectors (americium) among other things.

LLW should not be confused with high-level waste (HLW) or spent nuclear fuel (SNF). C Class low level waste has a limit of 100 nano-Curies per gram of alpha-emitting transuranic nuclides with a half life greater than 5 years; any more than 100 nCi, and it must be classified as transuranic waste (TRU). These require different disposal pathways. TRU wastes from the U.S. nuclear weapons complex is currently disposed at the Waste Isolation Pilot Plant (WIPP) near Carlsbad, New Mexico, though other sites also are being considered for on-site disposal of particularly difficult to manage TRU wastes.

See also
Low Level Waste Repository
Mixed waste (radioactive/hazardous)
Radioactive waste
Spent nuclear fuel
Transuranic waste

References

Notes

General references
Fentiman, Audeen W. and James H. Saling.  Radioactive Waste Management.  New York: Taylor & Francis, 2002. Second ed.
Jorge L. Contreras, "In the Village Square: Risk Misperception and Decisionmaking in the Regulation of Low-Level Radioactive Waste", 19 Ecology Law Quarterly 481 (1992) (SSRN)

External links
NRC description of low-level waste

Radioactive waste